Tun Omar Ong Yoke Lin (23 July 1917 – 1 July 2010) was a Malaysian politician, diplomat and businessman. He was a founding member of the Malaysian Chinese Association, and was a key figure in the country's road to independence. Ong served various positions in the government of Malaya and Malaysia, as a Cabinet minister and ambassador.

He was a Chinese Muslim convert.

Early life and education
Ong Yoke Lin was born on 23 July 1917 in Kuala Lumpur, he attended Pudu Girls' English School and later Victoria Institution, where he was contemporaries of, among others, Yahya Abdul Razak, Lee Siew Choh, Yaacob Latiff and Mahmood Ambak, the father-in-law of Abdullah Ahmad Badawi, the fifth Prime Minister of Malaysia. He passed the London Matriculation in 1935 and trained as a chartered accountant. He intended to read law, but his studies were put on hold by the Japanese occupation of Malaya.

Politics
Omar helped found and joined the Malayan Chinese Association (MCA) in 1949. As a prominent Chinese leader, Ong was selected by the British High Commissioner as a member of the then fully appointed Selangor State Council and Federal Legislative Council.

In 1952, he and Yahya Abdul Razak mooted the idea of an alliance between MCA and the United Malays National Organisation (UMNO) for the Kuala Lumpur Municipal Council elections. This was the precursor to the formal Alliance Party. He contested and won a seat in that election, and was chosen as leader of the Alliance Party in the Municipal Council.

Omar went on to become MCA vice-president and the Member of Parliament for Hulu Selangor.

In 1955, the Alliance Party won the first ever elections to the Federal Legislative Council under the leadership of Tunku Abdul Rahman. Omar was appointed Minister for Post and Telecoms in the Tunku's first Cabinet. Following the overwhelming support shown for the Alliance Party during the elections and the forming of the government, the Tunku led the Merdeka Delegation to London which successfully negotiated independence from the British. Omar joined the Tunku on his second trip to London in April 1957 to finalise the newly drafted Constitution of Malaya.

Independence and the formation of Malaysia
On 31 August 1957, Omar was appointed to the first Rahman cabinet of the newly independent Federation of Malaya, holding the Labour and Social Welfare portfolio. In 1959, he became Health Minister.

During negotiations to unite Malaya, Singapore, Sarawak and British North Borneo (later known as Sabah), Ong was Ambassador to the United Nations as Malaya focused on diplomacy amid regional tensions with Indonesia (Konfrontasi).

Following the proclamation of the Federation of Malaysia, Ong continued to serve in the Cabinet as Minister without Portfolio until 1973. He served concurrently as High Commissioner to Canada in 1966 and as Ambassador to Brazil from 1967 to 1972.

In 1973, he was elected President of the Dewan Negara and served until 1980.

Personal life
Tun Omar was married to Toh Puan Dr. Aishah and had three children. He converted to Islam in 1961.

Death
Ong died on 1 July 2010 due to old age. He was 92. His body was laid to rest at Makam Pahlawan near Masjid Negara, Kuala Lumpur.

Honours
  : 
  Commander of the Order of the Defender of the Realm (PMN) – Tan Sri (1959)
  : 
  Recipient of the Malaysian Commemorative Medal (Gold) (PPM) (1965)
  Grand Commander of the Order of Loyalty to the Crown of Malaysia (SSM) – Tun (1979)
  :
  Knight Commander of the Order of the Crown of Selangor (DPMS) – Dato’ (1971)
  Knight Grand Commander of the Order of the Crown of Selangor (SPMS) – Dato’ Seri (1973)
  :
  Grand Commander of the Order of Kinabalu (SPDK) – Datuk Seri Panglima (1973)

Notes

References
 Tun Omar Yoke-Lin Ong The Last Independence Fighter (1999 interview), and "First step to independence", The Star, 2 April 2001. Online at The Victoria Institution
 Catching up with... The Patriot with the golden heart, 17 December 2006, The Victoria Institution

1917 births
2010 deaths
Converts to Islam from Buddhism
Malaysian Muslims
Government ministers of Malaysia
Malaysian politicians of Chinese descent
Malaysian Chinese Association politicians
Permanent Representatives of Malaysia to the United Nations
Ambassadors of Malaysia to the United States
Malaysian expatriates in the United States
Ambassadors of Malaysia to Brazil
Malaysian accountants
Members of the Dewan Negara
Members of the Dewan Rakyat
High Commissioners of Malaysia to Canada
Kuala Lumpur politicians
Malaysian people of Hakka descent
Presidents of the Dewan Negara
Grand Commanders of the Order of Loyalty to the Crown of Malaysia
Commanders of the Order of the Defender of the Realm
Health ministers of Malaysia
Knights Grand Commander of the Order of the Crown of Selangor
Knights Commander of the Order of the Crown of Selangor
Grand Commanders of the Order of Kinabalu